West London generally refers to the western portions of London, and may refer specifically to:

West London, an inexactly defined part of London
West End of London
West End (ward)
W postcode area
University of West London